Guru Nanak College is a higher educational institution in Budhlada, Punjab, India, which is affiliated to the Punjabi University. It was established in 1971 to tribute the 500th birth anniversary of Shri Guru Nanak Dev Ji. College got 95% grant from Punjab Government. College was established under the UGC Act- 2f & 12b.

History

This college is under the management of S.G.P.C Sri Amritsar Sahib.

Guru Nanak College is situated in outskirts of Budhlada city. To tribute the 500th birth anniversary of "Shri Guru Nanak Dev Ji", it was started in 1971 by eminet personalities of the city keeping in mind the noble cause to make education affordable and accessible to all people of Budhlada city. In beginning, it was under local management but later handed over to SGPC, an apex body of the Sikhs committed to help the humanity, on 9 November 1994 due to less financial resources and other executive problems. After this, college got significant reforms in functioning and infrastructure. The college took a phenomenal pace since 2008 with a radical growth in a number of courses, faculty,  infrastructure and other learning resources. Now the college has become prominent organisation of the Mansa District having 12UG and 16 PG courses (excluding UGC Add-On courses). The college has the strength of 164 faculty members and 6500 students with state-of-the-art infrastrure and technology to provide quality education.

Infrastructure

College has the state-of-the-art infrastructure. College has Well-developed Library, Administration Block, Indoor Sports Complex, Computer Labs, Chemical Labs and two Hi-Tech Blocks for Science and Commerce Departments. Various Buildings of College are:-

Baba Banda Singh Bahadur Indoor Sports Complex
Bhai Nand Lal Academic Block
Bebe Nanaki Girls Hostel
Sh. Jassa Singh Ahluwalia Library

Clubs & Society
Media Club
Research Club
Social Club
Commerce and Management Association
Guru Hargobind Sahib History Society

Learn and Share Club

The Club is situated in Campus of GNC Budhlada. The Mission of Learn and Share Club is to produce a series of resources and tools such as peer learning, seminars, training modules, conferences, guest lectures and organization can use their own efforts to create better workplaces, so that everyone can easily share their innovative ideas with others. They can share scope of their relevant courses to the advisors.

References

External links
 

Mansa district, India
Universities and colleges in Punjab, India
1971 establishments in Punjab, India
Educational institutions established in 1971